Zoe Smith (born 26 April 1994) is an English weightlifter. In October 2010 she won a bronze medal in the women's 58kg division at the 2010 Commonwealth Games in Delhi, India, her first senior international competition, to become the first English woman to win a Commonwealth Games weightlifting medal. Smith competed at the 2012 Summer Olympics in London and finished 12th in the Women's 58kg division. After missing the 2016 Summer Olympics following an injury, she finished eighth in the 59kg at the 2020 Summer Olympics.

Early life
Zoe Smith was born on 26 April 1994. Smith attended De Lucy primary school in Abbey Wood and Townley Grammar School for Girls in Bexleyheath.

Sporting career
Smith was training as a gymnast when it was suggested she take up weightlifting to help her borough Greenwich compete in the London Youth Games. She won at the South East County Championships, her first major competition, and was selected for the 2008 Commonwealth Youth Games where she was the youngest member of the English team, and won the gold medal in the 53kg category. During 2008, she set national records 98 times across junior and senior classes, ending it holding all junior and senior records for the 53kg weight category, with the exception the clean and jerk record, and, in the 58kg category, every record that she could as someone aged under 18. The British Olympic Association named her their Athlete of the Year for Weightlifting.

Aged 15, Smith finished sixth at the 2009 European Junior Championships, competing against athletes up to four years older, a result that John Goodbody of The Sunday Times wrote "provided further evidence of her immense potential". In October 2010 she won a bronze medal in the women's 58kg division at the 2010 Commonwealth Games in Delhi, India, her first senior international competition, to become the first Englishwoman to win a Commonwealth Games weightlifting medal.

In May 2012 Smith was chosen, as part of Team GB, to represent Great Britain at the 2012 Summer Olympics in London.

By August 2016, Smith held four British clean and jerk records spread across three weight classes.

She missed being selected for the 2016 Olympics following a shoulder injury. 
Following UK Sport's decision to cut funding for weightlifting in 2016, Smith launched a crowdfunding appeal in July 2018, seeking to raise £10,000 to help her qualify for the 2020 Olympics. This target was reached by June 2019.

She is coached by Andy Callard.

Major competition results

Other results
2007: British Under 17s and Under 18s Champion
2008: British Under 17s Champion
2008: Commonwealth Youth Games: Gold.
2008: European Youth Championships: Clean & Jerk Silver.
2009: European Junior Championships: 6th
2009: World Youth Championships: 8th
2009: British U17 Championships: Champion
2009: British Junior Championships: Champion
2010: European Youth Championships:  Snatch Bronze; Clean & Jerk Silver; Total Silver.
2010: English Senior Championships: Champion
2010: British Senior Championships: Silver
2011: World Youth Championships: Silver
2012: British Senior Championships: Champion
2014: British Senior Championships: Champion
2014: English Senior Championships: Champion
2017: British Championships Silver Medal
2019: British Senior Championships: Champion

References

External links
 
 
 
 
 
 
 

1994 births
Living people
People from Greenwich
Sportspeople from London
English female weightlifters
Commonwealth Games gold medallists for England
Commonwealth Games bronze medallists for England
Commonwealth Games medallists in weightlifting
Weightlifters at the 2010 Commonwealth Games
Weightlifters at the 2014 Commonwealth Games
Weightlifters at the 2018 Commonwealth Games
Weightlifters at the 2022 Commonwealth Games
Olympic weightlifters of Great Britain
Weightlifters at the 2012 Summer Olympics
Black British sportswomen
People educated at Townley Grammar School
European Weightlifting Championships medalists
Weightlifters at the 2020 Summer Olympics
Medallists at the 2010 Commonwealth Games
Medallists at the 2014 Commonwealth Games
Medallists at the 2018 Commonwealth Games